"If the Lights Go Out" is a song written by Mike Batt for The Hollies, and first released by them in the July 1983 on the album What Goes Around.

Cash Box said that "a love-will-prevail-even-if-doomsday-comes message is affirmed by the group’s classic harmonies and guitar tones."

The cover version by Georgian-born, British singer Katie Melua, was released on 25 February 2008. It is Melua's eleventh single (not counting her number one duet of "What a Wonderful World" with Eva Cassidy) and the third from her third album, Pictures.

Track listings 
 "If The Lights Go Out" (Radio Mix)
 "Looking For Clues"

References

External links
Katie Melua website
Katie Melua 'If The Lights Go Out' Interview & Preview YouTube

2008 singles
Katie Melua songs
Songs written by Mike Batt
Song recordings produced by Mike Batt
The Hollies songs
2008 songs